Allentown, is a populated place located in Apache County, Arizona, United States.

Allentown got its start  when the railroad was extended to that point. The community was named after Allan Johnson, a cattleman. A post office called  was established in 1924, and remained in operation until 1930.

The site  of Allentown is included within the boundaries of the census-designated place of Houck

References

External links

Unincorporated communities in Apache County, Arizona
Unincorporated communities in Arizona